NRP Gonçalves Zarco was a second class  sloop (aviso de 2ª classe) of the Portuguese Navy. She was designed to operate in the overseas territories of Portugal. The ship entered service in 1933 and was among the core of the fleet until the late 1940s. Following World War II, new ships were acquired and Gonçalves Zarco was discarded 1969.

Design and description
They were based on the Royal Navy's s, but with a heavier armament and omitting the minelaying equipment of the British ships. They had a crew of 142 initially, but this was later reduced to 128.

Armament consisted of three  guns in single mounts on the ship's centreline, with two forward and one aft. Four 2-pounder (40 mm) pom-pom anti-aircraft (AA) guns were fitted, while four depth charge throwers provided an anti-submarine armament. In 1943, the 40 mm guns were removed and replaced by five single-mounted  AA cannon.

Construction and career
In 1930, Portugal set up a ten-year plan to modernise its navy. As part of this programme, a contract was placed with the British shipbuilder Hawthorn Leslie for two sloops, to be named  and Gonçalves Zarco. Gonçalves Zarco was laid down on 9 October 1931, and launched on 28 November 1932. Construction was completed in May 1933. It was among the ships that formed the core of the fleet until the late 1940s. They were tasked with coastal defence and defence of Portugal's colonial possessions. Following World War II, the ship was reclassified as a frigate. Portugal acquired new ships in the postwar era and Gonçalves Zarco was discarded in 1969.

Citations

References
 
 
 

Naval ships of Portugal
1932 ships